Tete Des Morts Township is a township in Jackson County, Iowa, USA.

History
Tete Des Morts Township was established in 1840.

References

Townships in Jackson County, Iowa
Townships in Iowa
1840 establishments in Iowa Territory